The 1990 Nevada gubernatorial election was held on November 6, 1990, to elect the next governor of Nevada, alongside an election to the United States House of Representatives and other state and local elections. Incumbent two-term Democratic Governor Richard Bryan resigned in 1989 after being elected to the United States Senate and under the Nevada succession law, Democrat Lieutenant Governor Bob Miller became the next governor. Miller won in a landslide victory to a full term, defeating Republican nominee Jim Gallaway.

Democratic primary

Candidate 
Bob Miller, incumbent Governor of Nevada
Rhinestone Cowboy
Knight Allen
William Harrison Morrison
Robert J. Edwards Sr.
Federick George Wilson

Results

Republican primary

Candidate 
Jim Gallaway, businessman
John Glab
Charlie Brown
Vince Lee Thompson
M.L. "Smokey" Stover
Loyd Ellis

Results

General election

Results

References

1990
Nevada
Gubernatorial